Johan Esteban Beltrán Montano (born 18 October 1999) is a Colombian footballer currently playing as a midfielder for Vysočina Jihlava.

Career statistics

Club
.

Notes

References

1999 births
Living people
Colombian footballers
Colombian expatriate footballers
Association football midfielders
Czech National Football League players
Categoría Primera A players
Once Caldas footballers
FC Vysočina Jihlava players
Colombian expatriate sportspeople in the Czech Republic
Expatriate footballers in the Czech Republic